The Danish Film Database (formerly Danish National Filmography, Danish: Danmarks Nationalfilmografi), is a database maintained by the Danish Film Institute (DFI) about Danish films since 1896 including silent films, short films, and documentary films. When it went online in November 2000, it included data on all  1,000 Danish films produced between 1968 and 2000, and  10,000 persons, which by 2014 had been expanded to 22,000 titles, 106,000 persons and 6,000 companies. A media gallery with photos, programmes, poster scans, and trailers is available. The database also includes information on premiere dates for foreign films in Danish cinemas since 2000.

References

See also 

 AllMovie
 AllMusic – a similar database, but for music
 All Media Network – a commercial database launched by the Rovi Corporation that compiles information from the former services AllMovie and AllMusic
 Animator.ru
 Big Cartoon DataBase
 DBCult Film Institute
 Discogs
 Douban
 Filmweb
 FindAnyFilm
 Flickchart
 Goodreads
 Internet Adult Film Database
 Internet Movie Cars Database (IMCDb)
 Internet Movie Firearms Database (IMFDb)
 Internet Book Database (IBookDb)
 Internet Broadway Database (IBDb)
 Internet Off-Broadway Database (IOBDb)
 Internet Speculative Fiction Database (ISFDb)
 Internet Theatre Database (ITDb)
 Letterboxd
 List of films considered the best
 List of films considered the worst
 Metacritic
 Rotten Tomatoes
 TheTVDB

External links 

 

Online film databases
Danish film websites
2000 establishments in Denmark